Codonanthopsis dissimulata is a species of flowering plant in the family Gesneriaceae. This species is native to northern Brazil, Colombia, Ecuador, French Guiana, Guyana, Peru, and Venezuela. Is an epiphyte and mainly grows in wet tropical biomes. The description was first published in 1978.

References

Gesnerioideae
Plants described in 1978
Flora of Brazil
Flora of Ecuador
Flora of Colombia
Flora of French Guiana
Flora of Guyana
Flora of Peru
Flora of Venezuela
Taxa named by Harold E. Moore